Niknam Deh (also Romanized as Nīknām Deh) is a village in Lavasan-e Bozorg Rural District of Lavasanat District of Shemiranat County, Tehran province, Iran. At the 2006 National Census, its population was 1,739 in 506 households. The following census in 2011 counted 1,297 people in 419 households. The latest census in 2016 showed a population of 3,441 people in 1,145 households; it was the largest village in its rural district.

References 

Shemiranat County

Populated places in Tehran Province

Populated places in Shemiranat County